Abu Ahmed al-Kuwaiti (1978 – May 2, 2011), real name: Ibrahim Saeed Ahmed (also known as Shaykh Abu Ahmed, Arshad Khan and Mohammed Arshad), was a Kuwaiti-born Pakistani terrorist and courier for Osama bin Laden.

He was not a Kuwaiti and not an Arab, but rather he was an ethnic Pashtun and a Pakistani citizen. He adopted the last name Al-Kuwaiti because his Pakistani parents lived in Kuwait. According to secret documents, he was one of the few men bin Laden completely trusted and was said to be his "favorite courier and right-hand man". He sheltered and lived with bin Laden for a number of years and was killed along with him by the U.S. Naval Special Warfare Development Group on 2 May 2011.

2000s
Al-Kuwaiti was a Pashtun who was born and grew up in Kuwait and spoke Pashto (in a cultivated, urbane accent) and Arabic. He was a protégé of Khalid Sheikh Mohammed and had reportedly given computer training in Karachi to the perpetrators of the September 11 attacks on the World Trade Center and the Pentagon. He was implicated in the attacks and was contacted in the aftermath by Riduan "Hambali" Isamuddin. Al-Kuwaiti provided a safe haven to Isamuddin and several of his close associates in his home in a quiet residential neighborhood of Karachi.

Guantanamo Bay documents dated 16 January 2008 revealed that Mohamedou Ould Salahi had claimed that Abu Ahmed al-Kuwaiti was wounded while fleeing Tora Bora after the Battle of Tora Bora in December 2001 and had later died from his arm injuries. The document claimed he was a mid-level al-Qaeda operative who facilitated the movement and safe haven of senior al-Qaeda members and families. As a speaker of Arabic and Pashto he could communicate and move easily among both the Arab members of al-Qaeda and the Pashtun tribesmen of Pakistan.

Contradicting the claims by Salahi that al-Kuwaiti had died in December 2001, in 2007 U.S. officials discovered the courier's real name and, in 2009, that he lived in Abbottabad, Pakistan. These findings were based on information collected from Guantánamo Bay detainees, notably Hassan Ghul in 2004. From Ghul, the United States intelligence learned that al-Kuwaiti was also close to Mohammed's successor Abu Faraj al-Libi.  Ghul further revealed that al-Kuwaiti had not been seen in some time, a fact which led U.S. officials to suspect he was traveling with Bin Laden. 

He was reportedly tracked from Peshawar by Pakistanis working for the CIA. "The National Security Agency reportedly tracked phone calls between the courier Abu Ahmed al-Kuwaiti's relatives in the Persian Gulf to all numbers in Pakistan, and NSA surveillance eventually tracked Abu Ahmed al-Kuwaiti's location in Pakistan via one such phone call", the AP writes.

"In August 2010 they tracked al-Kuwaiti as he drove from Peshawar to a residence in Abbottabad – and as analysts inventoried the compound's striking security features they became convinced that it housed a high-level al-Qaeda figure."

2010s
Using satellite photos and intelligence reports, the CIA sought to identify the inhabitants of the fortified compound in Abbottabad. In September 2010, the CIA concluded that the compound was "custom built to hide someone of significance" and that it was very likely that Osama bin Laden was residing there. Al-Kuwaiti was said to be one of the two tall fair-skinned bearded men who claimed to be ethnic Pashtuns and were known in the community to be living at the house and occasionally attended local funerals.

He went locally by the name Arshad Khan, and his brother (or cousin as some neighbors thought) went by the name Tareq Khan. They claimed to be from a village near the town of Charsadda. Some people believed he was from Shangla (Khakhtagatta area). Charsadda lies about 180 kilometres to the west, while Shangla is situated on the northern side 190 kilometres from Abbottabad in Pakistan's Khyber Pakhtunkhwa province (old name NWFP). Some locals thought that the Khan brothers had obtained their wealth from a family-owned hotel in Dubai. Al-Kuwaiti also claimed that because of his occupation as a money changer, he needed high walls to keep out enemies he had encountered in his profession. He was described as "a friendly man from the tribal-areas".

Death
Al-Kuwaiti, along with Bin Laden, was killed during the raid on the compound by a United States Naval Special Warfare Development Group team on 2 May 2011. According to the book No Easy Day, Al-Kuwaiti was shot and killed by Chief Petty Officer Matt Bissonnette and Petty Officer 1st Class Will Chesney (the latter was the handler of Cairo, a Belgian Shepherd and U.S. military working dog who also participated in the raid) during a short gunfight in the compound's guest house. Bissonnette was lightly injured with bullet fragments in the left shoulder while Al-Kuwaiti's wife Mariam was shot and wounded in the right shoulder in the crossfire.

References

1978 births
2011 deaths
Kuwaiti al-Qaeda members
Pakistani al-Qaeda members
Al-Qaeda planners
Killing of Osama bin Laden
Deaths by firearm in Pakistan
Pashtun people
Kuwaiti people of Pakistani descent
Date of birth missing
Place of birth missing